Scab may refer to:

Biology
 Scab, a hard coating on the skin formed during the wound healing reconstruction phase
 scAb, single-chain antibody fragment

Infections and infestations
 Apple scab, an apple tree (genus Malus) fungal disease caused by Venturia inaequalis
 Black scab, a potato fungal disease caused by Synchytrium endobioticum
 Common scab, a plant bacterial disease caused by Streptomyces species
 Fusarium head blight, a fungal disease of plants, e.g., grain crops (especially wheat and oats), golf course grass, caused by the several species of Fusarium
 Pear scab, a pear fungal disease caused by Venturia pirina or Fusicladium pyrorum
 Poinsettia scab, a spot anthracnose disease caused by Sphaceloma poinsettiae
 Powdery scab, a disease of the skin of potatoes caused by the protozoa Spongospora subterranea
 Sheep scab, a skin disease of sheep caused by the mite Psoroptes ovis

Labor
 Scab, a pejorative term for a strikebreaker, a person who works despite strike action or against the will of other employees

Other uses
 South Coast Air Basin, in California, US
 Johnny Dole & The Scabs, one of the first punk rock bands in Australia

See also
Scabs (disambiguation)
Channeled Scablands, an eroded landscape formed by Missoula Floods in the U.S. state of Washington
Scabies, a skin disease caused by the mite Sarcoptes scabiei
U.S. Wheat and Barley Scab Initiative, a joint government and academic program to develop control measures to minimize the threat of Fusarium head blight (scab) in the United States